The men's 150m individual medley events at the 2022 World Para Swimming Championships were held at the Penteada Olympic Swimming Complex in Madeira between 12–18 June.

Medalists

Results

SM3
Heats
11 swimmers from 11 nations took part. The swimmers with the top eight times, regardless of heat, advanced to the final.

Final
The final was held on 13 June 2022.

SM4

References

2022 World Para Swimming Championships